Tsing Yi Heung Sze Wui Road is one of the oldest roads on the Tsing Yi Island, Hong Kong. It was built to connect Tsing Yi Town and Tsing Yi Bridge when the bridge was being built. The name "Tsing Yi Heung Sze Wui" derives from the local Cantonese pronunciation of Tsing Yi Rural Committee. After the reclamation of Tsing Yi Lagoon and Tsing Yi Bay, the road ended at Chun Kwan Temple. The office building of the Tsing Yi Rural Committee is very close to the temple, though it is on Fung Shue Wo Road. Tsing Yi Fire Station and Tsing Yi Police Station are also on the road.

See also
List of streets and roads in Hong Kong

References

External links

Google Maps of Tsing Yi Heung Sze Wui Road

Tsing Yi
Roads in the New Territories